Elizaveta "Liza" Hikmativna Malakhova (born 13 March 1993),  Soloviova, is a Ukrainian chess player who holds the title of Woman grandmaster (WGM, 2010).

Chess career
Multiple medal winner in Ukrainian girls' championships in the different age categories: two gold (U12 -2005, U14 - 2007) and three silver (U10 - 2003, U14 - 2006, U18 - 2008). In 2007 she won silver medal in European Youth Chess Championship in the age category U14. In 2014 she won third prize in Moscow chess festival Moscow Open student tournament. In 2016 in Rivne she won Ukrainian women's chess championship.

In 2009, she was awarded the FIDE Woman International Master (WIM) title and received the FIDE Woman Grandmaster (WGM) title year later.

References

External links

1993 births
Living people
Ukrainian female chess players
Chess woman grandmasters
Sportspeople from Lviv